This is a list of decommissioned vessels of the Italian Navy since 1949.

Submarines

Battleships

Cruisers

Destroyers

Frigates

Corvettes

Torpedo boats

Gunboats

Hydrofoil missile boats

Minesweeper

Minelayer

Landing ship

Landing craft

Replenishment ships

Boom defence vessels

Water tanker vessels

Transport ships

Coastal Transport Vessels - MTC

Rescue Ship

Factory vessel

Headlights service vessel

Survey vessels

Research vessels

Training vessels

Tugboats

Others

ROV

See also
List of active Italian Navy ships
Italian Navy

References 

Italy
Navy ships